Predrag Jokić (born 3 February 1983 in Kotor) is a Montenegrin 1.88 m tall water polo player. He is a member of the Montenegro men's national water polo team at the 2008 Summer Olympics, 2012 Summer Olympics, and the 2016 Summer Olympics.In 2003 he won the gold medal with Serbia and Montenegro at the European Championship in Kranj,Slovenia.

At the 2004 Olympics, he won a silver as a member of Serbia and Montenegro team.

At the 2008 Summer Olympics, the Montenegro team reached the semifinals, where they were defeated by Hungary and Serbia in the bronze medal match.

At the 2012 Summer Olympics, Montenegro lost to Croatia in their semi-final, and then to Serbia again in the bronze medal match.

At the 2016 Summer Olympics, Montenegro lost to Croatia in the semifinals and then lost to Italy in the bronze medal match. Jokić was given the honour to carry the national flag of Montenegro at the closing ceremony of the 2016 Summer Olympics, becoming the 25th water polo player to be a flag bearer at the opening and closing ceremonies of the Olympics.

See also
 Montenegro men's Olympic water polo team records and statistics
 Serbia and Montenegro men's Olympic water polo team records and statistics
 List of Olympic medalists in water polo (men)
 List of players who have appeared in multiple men's Olympic water polo tournaments
 List of flag bearers for Montenegro at the Olympics
 List of world champions in men's water polo
 List of World Aquatics Championships medalists in water polo

References

External links
 

1983 births
Living people
Montenegrin male water polo players
Serbia and Montenegro male water polo players
Olympic water polo players of Montenegro
Olympic water polo players of Serbia and Montenegro
Water polo players at the 2004 Summer Olympics
Water polo players at the 2008 Summer Olympics
Water polo players at the 2012 Summer Olympics
Water polo players at the 2016 Summer Olympics
Olympic silver medalists for Serbia and Montenegro
Olympic medalists in water polo
Medalists at the 2004 Summer Olympics
World Aquatics Championships medalists in water polo